The Roman Catholic Our Lady of Assumption Church, also known as the Red Church, stands in the Swiss city of Neuchâtel in the diocese of Lausanne, Geneva and Freiburg. The Neo-Gothic church was planned by Guillaume Ritter and consecrated on March 25, 1906. After a major renovation between 1984 and 2000, it was recognized in 1986 as a national monument. In 2007 Pope Benedict XVI raised the church's status to that of basilica minor.

The building is constructed of artificial stone, made on site and tinted to obtain the reddish appearance of Alsace sandstone. The interior has three aisles and a transept. In addition to 14 large paintings representing the Stations of the Cross, five choir windows and a large rosette, the vaulted roof is designed to represent the night sky with almost 10,000 stars. In 1937 a new high altar by the architect Fernand Dumas de Romont was created whose centrepiece is a calvary by Marcel Feuillat. In 1933, three large bells, named Maria-Josepha, Faith and Charity, replaced the three smaller ones dating from 1912.

Apart from serving the spiritual needs of 62,000 Neuchâtel Catholics, the basilica is also the most important pilgrimage church in the canton.

The Swiss theologian and mystic Maurice Zundel is buried in the church.

See also
 List of Roman Catholic basilicas

References

 Claire Piguet, Gilles Barbey: Inventar der neueren Schweizer Architektur – 1850–1920. Neuenburg. Kapitel aus Band 7 der Gesamtreihe. Bern: Gesellschaft für Schweizerische Kunstgeschichte 2000. S. 194 f., S. 225. .
This article is based on a translation of the equivalent articles on German and French Wikipedia

Roman Catholic Diocese of Lausanne, Geneva and Fribourg
Roman Catholic churches in Switzerland
Basilica churches in Switzerland